Phaedropsis venadialis is a moth in the family Crambidae. It was described by Schaus in 1920. It is found in Mexico (Sinaloa).

The wingspan is about 15 mm. The wings are yellow with black lines. The base of the costa and cell of the forewings are fuscous. There is a fine short basal streak below the cell and an antemedial line outbent in the cell, vertical below it to the inner margin, followed in the cell by a white spot edged with black.

References

Spilomelinae
Moths described in 1920